Colobopsis saundersi, synonym Camponotus saundersi, is a species of ant found in Malaysia and Brunei, belonging to the genus Colobopsis. A worker can explode suicidally and aggressively as an ultimate act of defense, an ability it has in common with several other species in this genus and a few other insects. The ant has an enormously enlarged mandibular (jaw) gland, many times the size of a normal ant, which produces defense adhesive secretions. According to a 2018 study, this species forms a species complex and is probably related to C. explodens, which is part of the C. cylindrica group.

Defenses

Its defensive behaviours include self-destruction by autothysis, a term coined by Maschwitz and Maschwitz (1974). Two oversized, poison-filled mandibular glands run the entire length of the ant's body. When combat takes a turn for the worse, the worker ant violently contracts its abdominal muscles to rupture its gaster at the intersegmental fold, which also bursts the mandibular glands, thereby spraying a sticky secretion in all directions from the anterior region of its head. The glue, which also has corrosive properties and functions as a chemical irritant, can entangle and immobilize all nearby victims.

Direct observation by Jones (2004) found that C. saundersi adhesive secretions range from bright white at the end of the wet season to cream or pale yellow in the dry season and start of the wet season. These variations in coloration represent a shift in internal pH, likely due to seasonal changes in diet.

Territorial defense
Autothysis in C. saundersi is common during territorial battles with other ant species or groups. Territorial weaver ants (Oecophylla smaragdina) are known to stalk and attack C. saundersi for territory as well as for predation. Self-sacrifice of C. saundersi workers is likely to help the colony as a whole by ensuring that the colony retains its foraging territory. Therefore, such behavior would continue within a population given that the behavior was already genetically present within the majority of workers.

Defense against predation
C. saundersi uses autothysis to defend against predation by other arboreal arthropods (weaver ants, spiders), which are believed to be the main predatory threat to C. saundersi for two reasons:

 Jones (2004) noted through direct observation that C. saundersi is "remarkably sensitive" to even slight leaf vibration.
 The inherent adhesive qualities of C. saundersis secretion are more effective in immobilizing the appendages of arthropods as opposed to those of vertebrates.

C. saundersi also uses autothysis to defend against vertebrate predators because the chemicals involved are inedible, which could deter certain predators from engaging this species of ant in the future.

Chemicals
The "toxic glue" of C. saundersi is predominately composed of polyacetates, aliphatic hydrocarbons, and alcohols. Branched-skeleton lactones and methylated isocoumarins produced in the hindgut function as trail pheromones, while straight-chain hydrocarbons and esters produced in the Dufour's glands act as alarm pheromones in C. saundersi and related species.
Jones, et al. (2004) identified the following chemicals within the secretion:

Phenols
 m-cresol (traces found), a corrosive compound
 2,4-Dihydroxyacetophenone
 2-Methyl-5,7-dihydroxychromone
 Orcinol (traces found)
Aliphatics
 Undecane
 2-Heptanone (traces found)
Terpenoids
 Citronellal
 Citronellol
 Citronellic acid
 Isopulegol
 (6R)-(E)-2,6-Dimethyl-2-octen-1,8-dioic acid

Both 2,4-Dihydroxyacetophenone and 2-Methyl-5,7-dihydroxychromone are phenolic ketones which cause the pH-dependent color changes of the secretion.

(6R)-(E)-2,6-Dimethyl-2-octen-1,8-dioic acid is an acyclic monoterpene previously undocumented in insects. However, the chemical is well known to be a urinary metabolite in mammals, with overproduction resulting in toxic acidosis in various species.

Gallery

See also

References

External links 

  Photos of the ant.

Colobopsis
Hymenoptera of Asia
Endemic fauna of Borneo
Insects of Brunei
Insects of Malaysia
Ant
Insects described in 1889
Taxa named by Carlo Emery